Boeng Keng Kang is a section (khan) in Phnom Penh, Cambodia.
This khan was created on January 8, 2019, according to sub-decree 03 អនក្រ.បក by taking 7 quarters (sangkat) from Chamkar Mon Section. It has a population of 66,658.

Administration 
As of 2019, Boeng Keng Kang has 7 quarters (sangkat) and 55 villages (phum).

Education
Harrods International Academy has two campuses in Boeung Keng Kang I: the main campus and the early years campus.

References 

Boeng Keng Kang